Bhookh may refer to:
 Bhookh (1978 film), a Bollywood action film
 Bhookh (1947 film), a Bollywood film